Introduction to Commutative Algebra is a well-known commutative algebra textbook written by Michael Atiyah and Ian G. Macdonald. It deals with elementary concepts of commutative algebra including localization, primary decomposition, integral dependence, Noetherian and Artinian rings and modules, Dedekind rings, completions and a moderate amount of dimension theory. It is notable for being among the shorter English-language introductory textbooks in the subject, relegating a good deal of material to the exercises. 

(Hardcover 1969) (Paperback 1994)

1969 non-fiction books
Mathematics textbooks
Commutative algebra